Robert Openshawe (before 1575 – 1627) was a priest in Ireland.

Openshawe was educated at St John's College, Cambridge. He was ordained in 1575 and held the living at Benacre. He was Dean of Clogher from 1606 to 1617; and Dean of Connor from then until his death in 1627.

References

Alumni of St John's College, Cambridge
Deans of Clogher
Deans of Connor
1627 deaths